Kamalbazar is a municipality in Achham District in Sudurpashchim Province of Nepal that was established on 18 September 2015 by merging the former Village development committees Bayala, Dhaku,Birpath, Chalsa, Sera, Muli and Mashtabandali and Kuika. Kamalbazar is a trade centre for East Achham. It also has a Primary Health Center and some banking facilities, which benefit locals, as they previously had to go the district headquarter Mangalsen to use such services. Wind energy facilities and solar power facilities support the local power supply.. Administrative offices are located in the former Bayala.

At the time of the 2011 Nepal census it had a population of 23,738 people living in 4,482  individual households.

Transportation  
Kamalbazar Airport lies in Kamalbazar but is currently out of operation.

References

Populated places in Achham District
Village development committees in Achham District
Nepal municipalities established in 2015
Municipalities in Achham District